Best Of: Self-Destruction  is a compilation album by the Canadian rock group Moxy in the band's original incarnation with Buzz Shearman, Earl Johnson, Buddy Caine, Bill Wade  and Terry Juric, released in 1993. There are two distinct versions of the album, with the original release having one song, "Take It or Leave It" added to the track listing. The album also featured The Buddy Caine Band  song "Feed The Fire", written in tribute to Shearman by Buddy Caine.

Credits 
 Buzz Shearman: vocals
 Earl Johnson: Guitar
 Buddy Caine: Guitar
 Bill Wade: drums
 Terry Juric: Bass
 Tommy Bolin: Guitar * Note: Solo only
 Jack Douglas
 Mark Smith

Track listing 

 Can't You See I'm a Star - 3:36 - From Moxy I - (1975)
 Out of the Darkness - 4:50 - From Moxy I - (1975) *
 Sail On Sail Away - 4:52 - From Moxy I - (1975)
 Fantasy - 5:40 - From Moxy I - (1975) *
 Moon Rider -  4:25 - From Moxy I - (1975) *
 Cause There's Another - 3:43 - From Moxy II - (1976)
 Change in My Life - 4:37 - From Moxy II - (1976)
 Tryin' Just for You - 4:28 - From Moxy II - (1976)
 Wet Suit - 4:52 - From Moxy II - (1976)
 Nothin' Comes Easy - 4:22  - From Ridin' High -  (1977)
 Sweet Reputation - 3:54 - From Ridin' High -  (1977)
 Ridin' High (Remix) - 4:03 - From Ridin' High -  (1977)
 Nothin' Comes Easy (Reprise) - 1:00 - From Ridin' High -  (1977)
 Trouble  - 3:52 - From A Tribute to Buzz Shearman - (1984)
 Feed the Fire - 5:05 - (The Buddy Caine Band) (Buddy Caine)
 Take It or Leave It  - 3:40 - From Moxy II - (1976) - (extra track on original version of album)

Reissued 
Moxy’s original catalogue of albums were again available starting in 1994 when Valerie Shearman ("Buzz" widow) oversaw the release of all of Moxy's back catalogue of albums on CD through Pacemaker Records, and again starting in  2002 this time through Unidisc Music Inc.

References

External links 
 Moxy Official Web Site

1993 greatest hits albums
Moxy (band) albums